The 2010–11 Danish Cup was the 57th season of the Danish football cup competition. For the third year, the sponsor of the competition was Ekstra Bladet, a daily newspaper, who signed a 3-year contract with the Danish Football Association (DBU) in 2008, making the official name Ekstra Bladet Cup 2010–11.

The competition opened on 9 August 2010 with the First Round and concluded on 22 May 2011 with the Final at the Parken Stadium.

First round

In this round entered 96 teams. There were 48 matches in the First Round, taking place between 9 and 17 August 2010.

Second round

The clubs who placed 5–10 in the 2009–10 Superliga – AaB, Midtjylland, Nordsjælland, Silkeborg, SønderjyskE and Randers – as well as the top two clubs from the 2009–10 First Division – Horsens and Lyngby – received a bye into the second round.  These matches were played from 24 to 26 August 2010.

Third round
The top four teams from the 2008–09 Superliga – Copenhagen, OB, Brøndby and Esbjerg – received a bye into the third round. These matches took place on 22, 23 and 29 September 2010.

|}

Fourth round

The sixteen winners in Round 3 took part in Round 4. The draw occurred on 25 September 2010. The matches took place between 26 and 28 October 2010.

|}

Quarter-finals
The eight winners from the previous round competed in this round. These matches took place between 9 and 11 November 2010.

Semi-finals
The four winners from the Quarter Finals will compete in this round. This round will be played as a two-legged tie. The legs will be played on 27 April and 4 May 2011.

|}

First Legs

Second Legs

Final

The final was played on 22 May 2011.

References

External links
 Official results at Danish FA official website

2010-11
2010–11 domestic association football cups
Cup